José Antonio Jiménez Salas (10 March 1916 – 15 November 2000) was a Spanish professor of civil engineering and an elected academic of the Spanish Royal Academy of Sciences.

Life and career
Jiménez Salas was born in Zaragoza in 1916. He attended a Marist Brothers school in Zaragoza, before completing his initial education at IES San Isidro after his family moved to Madrid. After completing his high school studies, he studied at the School of Civil Engineering (ETSICCP) in Madrid. His studies were interrupted by the outbreak of the Spanish Civil War in which he fought after enlisting in Zaragoza in 1936. He returned to his studies after the war and graduated as a Civil Engineer in 1942, as the second-placed student in a class of eighteen.

Between 1942 and 1943, he studied Applied Geology and Soil Mechanics at the Technical University of Munich and TU Wien on a scholarship, returning to Spain in 1943. After returning to Spain, Jiménez Salas was Professor of Bridges, Structures and Geotechnics at the ETSICCP, before becoming a Senior Professor of Geotechnics and Foundations.

In addition to his work in geotechnical engineering, he was heavily involved with the creation of the Spanish Society of Soil Mechanics, and is notable as the principal author of a series of books on geotechnical engineering and foundations, published in three volumes between 1971 and 1981. He received the Grand Cross of the Order of Civil Merit in 1974, and the Medal of Honour for the Promotion of Invention from the Spanish Government in 1994. He died in Madrid in November 2000. His son, Javier Jiménez Sendín, is a professor of engineering and a notable researcher in the field of fluid mechanics and turbulence.

References

1916 births
2000 deaths
Spanish civil engineers
People from Zaragoza